The Enchanted Boy (Zakoldovanyy malchik) is a 1955 Soviet/Russia traditionally animated feature film directed by Vladimir Polkovnikov and Aleksandra Snezhko-Blotskaya.  The film is an adaptation of The Wonderful Adventures of Nils by Selma Lagerlöf. It was produced at the Soyuzmultfilm studio in Moscow.

The film's image and sound were recently restored by the Russian company Krupnyy Plan, which released it on video and DVD packaged together with Cipollino, a 1961, 40-minute feature film directed by Boris Dyozhkin. No English-subtitled version has been released.

Plot
The naughty boy Nils, who delights in torturing animals, is bewitched by a tomte.  Now shrunken to a small size and able to talk to animals, he flies across Lapland on the backs of wild geese. During these dangerous travels he does many noble deeds, and, at the same time, searches for the tomte who would take the spell away.

Creators

Video
In the early nineties the animated film was released on videotapes by the film association "Krupnyy Plan". In the middle of the 1990s, it was included in the collection "The Best Soviet Animated Films" by Studio PRO Video and in the collection of animated films of a film studio "Soyuzmultfilm".

See also
History of Russian animation
List of animated feature-length films

External links

 (Official Russian)
 (Russian with English subtitles)
The Enchanted Boy at the Animator.ru
The Enchanted Boy at Myltik.ru 
The Enchanted Boy at Krupnyy Plan 

1955 animated films
1955 films
Films based on fairy tales
Soviet animated films
Soyuzmultfilm
Films based on works by Selma Lagerlöf